This is a list of A.C. Milan honours. A.C. Milan is an Italian football club. This article contains historical and current trophies pertaining to the club.

National titles (33)
Italian Football Championship / Serie A (first division):
Winners (19): 1901, 1906, 1907, 1950–51, 1954–55, 1956–57, 1958–59, 1961–62, 1967–68, 1978–79, 1987–88, 1991–92, 1992–93, 1993–94, 1995–96, 1998–99, 2003–04, 2010–11, 2021–22
Runners-up (16): 1902, 1947–48, 1949–50, 1951–52, 1955–56, 1960–61, 1964–65, 1968–69, 1970–71, 1971–72, 1972–73, 1989–90, 1990–91, 2004–05, 2011–12, 2020–21

Serie B (second division):
Winners (2): 1980–81, 1982–83

Coppa Italia:
Winners (5): 1966–67, 1971–72, 1972–73, 1976–77, 2002–03
Runners-up (9): 1941–42, 1967–68, 1970–71, 1974–75, 1984–85, 1989–90, 1997–98, 2015–16, 2017–18

Supercoppa Italiana:
Winners (7): 1988, 1992, 1993, 1994, 2004, 2011, 2016
Runners-up (5): 1996, 1999, 2003, 2018, 2022

European titles (17)

European Cup/UEFA Champions League:
Winners (7): 1962–63, 1968–69, 1988–89, 1989–90, 1993–94, 2002–03, 2006–07
Runners-up (4): 1957–58, 1992–93, 1994–95, 2004–05

European Cup Winners' Cup:
Winners (2): 1967–68, 1972–73
Runners-up (1): 1973–74

European Super Cup/UEFA Super Cup:
Winners (5): 1989, 1990, 1994, 2003, 2007
Runners-up (2): 1973, 1993

Latin Cup:
Winners (2): 1951, 1956
Runners-up (1): 1953

Mitropa Cup:
Winners (1): 1982

Worldwide titles (4)
Intercontinental Cup:
Winners (3): 1969, 1989, 1990
Runners-up (4): 1963, 1993, 1994, 2003

FIFA Club World Cup:
Winners (1): 2007

Friendly competitions

Domestic

 Torneo FGNI: 5 (record)
 1902, 1904; 1905; 1906; 1907
 Coppa Federale: 1 (record)
 1915-1916
 Medaglia del Re: 3
 1900; 1901; 1902
 Trofeo Albero di Natale: 1
 1900
 Coppa Novara: 1
 1903
 Coppa Reyer San Marco di Venezia: 2
 1903; 1905
 Coppa Lombardia: 1
 1904
 Torneo di Alessandria: 1
 1904
 Palla Dapples: 23
 From 1905 to 1908
 Coppa Spensley: 2
 1905-1906, 1906-1907
 Medaglia Esposizione Internazionale di Milano: 1
 1906
 Medaglia d'oro Ausonia: 1
 1906-1907
 Coppa Solcio: 3
 1909-1910, 1910-1911, 1911-1912
 Torneo di Brescia: 1
 1909-1910
 Coppa Mantova: 1
 1909-1910
 Challenge Pro Vicenza: 1
 1910-1911
 Scarpa d'argento Gerolamo Radice: 3
 1911-1912, 1914-1915, 1921-1922
 Coppa Lario: 2
 1912-1913, 1913-1914
 Medaglia Comitato Pro Aviazione Nazionale: 1
 1912-1913
 Coppa Marx: 1
 1914-1915
 Torneo di Milano: 1
 1914-1915
 Coppa Natale: 1
 1914-1915
 Coppa Gazzetta dello Sport: 1
 1915-1916
 Coppa Val d'Olona: 1
 1916-1917
 Coppa Boneschi: 1
 1916-1917
 Coppa Unione e Progresso Monza: 1
 1916-1917
 Coppa Regionale Lombarda: 1
 1916-1917
 Coppa Mauro: 1
 1917-1918
 Coppa Giurati: 1
 1918-1919
 Trofeo Lombardi e Macchi: 1
 1924-1925
 Torneo del Littorio: 1
 1926-1927
 Coppa Casinò di Sanremo: 1
 1934-1935
 Coppa Angelo Monti: 1
 1944-1945
 Coppa Disciplina: 4
 1949-1950, 1950-1951, 1954-1955, 1956-1957
 Torneo Città di Milano: 2
 1963; 1978
 Coppa Luigi Carraro: 1
 1967-1968
 Coppa Giuseppe Meazza: 1
 1987-1988
 Memorial Armando Picchi: 1
 1989
 Summer Tournament Padova: 1
 1992
 Trofeo Luigi Berlusconi: 13
 1992; 1993; 1994; 1996; 1997; 2002; 2005; 2006; 2007; 2008; 2009; 2011; 2014
 Coppa del Mediterraneo: 2
 1992; 1994
 Memorial Giorgio Ghezzi: 2
 1993; 1994
 Memorial Trabattoni: 1
 2000-2001
 TIM Trophy: 5
 2001; 2006; 2008; 2014; 2015
 Trofeo Seat Pagine Gialle: 1
 2005
 Trofeo città di Chiasso: 1
 2013-2014
 Trofeo San Nicola: 1
 2015

International

 Coppa dell'Amicizia: 3
 1959; 1960; 1961
 Coppa Chiasso: 3
 1906; 1907; 1908
 Coppa Lugano: 2
 1907-1908, 1908-1909
 Coppa Camille Blanc: 1
 1920-1921
 Coupe de La Vie: 1
 1932
 Coppa città di Nizza: 2
 1932-1933, 1933-1934
 Torneo di Caracas: 1
 1964-1965
 Coppa città di Toronto: 1
 1968-1969
 Torneo città di New York: 1
 1968-1969
 Trofeo Villa de Madrid: 3
 1973; 1977; 1991
 Mundialito de Clubs: 1
 1987
 Trofeo Santiago Bernabéu: 2
 1988; 1990
 Torneo città di Zurigo: 1
 1991-1992
 Torneo di Capodanno Amaro Lucano: 1
 1991-1992
 Columbus Cup Tournament: 1
 1991-1992
 CSIL Champions Cup: 1
 1991-1992
 Coppa del Mediterraneo: 2
 1992-1993, 1994-1995
 Torneo Nereo Rocco: 1
 1992-1993
 Trofeo Ciudad de Oviedo: 1
 1993
 Torneo Ciudad de la Coruna: 1
 1992-1993
 Trofeo Città di Barcellona: 1
 1994
 CBC Cup: 1
 1993-1994
 Shenyang Cup: 1
 1993-1994
 Tokyo Cup: 1
 1993-1994
 Pengyei Cup: 1
 1994-1995
 Coppa del Drago: 1
 1994-1995
 Opel Cup: 1
 1994-1995
 Trofeo di Navarra: 1
 1996-1997
 Opel Master Cup: 3
 1997; January 1999; August 1999
 Trofeo Juan Acuna: 1
 1998
 Trofeo San Benedetto del Tronto: 1
 1998
 Qatar Airway Trophy: 1
 2002
 Champions World Series: 1
 2004
 Dubai Challenge Cup: 4
 2009; 2011; 2012; 2014
 Taçi Oil Cup: 1
 2009
 Telekom Cup: 1
2022

Awards
 Gazzetta Sports Award as best Italian sports team of the year: 1979, 1989, 2007, 2022
 Gazzetta Sports Award as best worldwide sports team of the year: 1989
 Serie A Football Club of the Year: 2022
 IFFHS The World's Club Team of the Year: 1995, 2003
 World Soccer Men's World Team of the Year: 1989, 1994, 2003
 France Football European Team of the Year: 1989, 1990

Rankings
European Cup / UEFA Champions League all-time club rankings (since 1955): 7th place
 UEFA coefficient top-ranked club by 5-year period (since 1975–1979): 2 times (2002-2006 and 2003-2007)
 Second most successful Italian club by number of trophies won: 49
 FIFA Club of the Century: 9th place
 Fourth place in the IFFHS list of the best European clubs of the 20th century.
 Fifth place in the IFFHS All-time club world ranking.
 Third place in the list of Top clubs of the 20th century by Kicker sports magazine.
 Fourth place in the top 100 clubs in the history of European competitions by L'Equipe French magazine.
 Fourth place in the top 40 clubs in the history of European competitions by the BBC.

References

External links
A.C. Milan honours at acmilan.com
Other official trophies at magliarossonera.it
Unofficial and friendly trophies at magliarossonera.it

Statistics
Honours